Ev'rybody Know Me is the third studio album by American Southern hip hop duo YoungBloodZ from Atlanta, Georgia. It was released on December 13, 2005 via LaFace Records. The album features guest appearances from Akon, Ben-Hated, Cutty Cartel, Daz Dillinger,  Jazze Pha, Lil' Scrappy, Mannie Fresh, Mr. Mo, Proverb, Shawty Putt, T-Boz and Young Buck. It peaked at number 44 on the Billboard 200, at number 7 on the Top R&B/Hip-Hop Albums chart and at number 4 on the Top Rap Albums chart in the United States.

Track listing

Charts

Weekly charts

Year-end charts

References

External links

2005 albums
YoungBloodZ albums
LaFace Records albums
Albums produced by Akon
Albums produced by Lil Jon
Albums produced by Jazze Pha
Albums produced by Mannie Fresh
Albums produced by Scott Storch
Albums produced by Daz Dillinger
Albums produced by Mr. Collipark